The 1975 season of the Montserrat Championship was the first season of top flight association football competition in Montserrat. Police won the championship.

References

1974 domestic association football leagues
1974 in Montserrat
Montserrat Championship seasons